TECO Electric & Machinery Co., Ltd. (TECO) is a Taiwanese company established on June 12, 1956. The company began as an industrial motor manufacturer. The company has expanded service offerings into a conglomerate with worldwide business operations. Now has around 8% market share and also ranked number 5 in global low-voltage A/C motor market, representing 4% of the world. 

The Company also engages in the manufacture, installation, wholesale, and retail of various types of electrical and mechanical equipment, telecommunication equipment, and home appliances.

Company history
1956     Taiwan Electric Company (TECO) established

1970     Produced air conditioners and entered the home appliances market

1986     Joint venture with Westinghouse Electric to form TECO Westinghouse Motor

1989     Founded TECO Industry Malaysia Sdn. Bhd.

1990     Founded Toshiba Compressor (Taiwan) Corp. with Toshiba

1992     Established Yatec Engineering Corporation with Yaskawa Electric Manufacture Co., Ltd.

1995     Acquired Westinghouse Motor Co., Ltd (USA)

1998     Founded TECO Electro Devices Co., Ltd. for manufacturing of stepping motors

1999     Founded TECO (Dong Guan) Air Conditioning Equipment Co., Ltd.
 
2000     Founded Suzhou TECO Electric & Machinery Co., Ltd.
 
2001     Established Smart Card Division for National Health Insurance IC-card project

2002     Founded Wuxi TECO with China Steel, Nippon Steel and Marubeni-Itochu Steel
 
2003     Merged Tai-An Electric Co., Ltd.

2004     Established Jiangxi TECO Electric & Machinery Co., Ltd.

2005     Founded Yaskawa TECO Motor Engineering Corp.

2006     Strategic alliance with CTC to set up the first wind power project in Texas, USA

2007     Launch into wind power generation; introduce a 2MW wind power generator

2010     Rollout of TECO's first 2MW wind power turbine

2011     TECO Middle East KSA

2013     A joint venture with Fujio Food System of Japan established Meile Food Catering in Taiwan. In December, the Taiwan Home Delivery Stock Exchange was listed.

2015     Established an offshore wind power system manufacturing company "Xinneng Wind Power Co., Ltd." with China Steel.

2016     Won the Taiwan Corporate Sustainability Award (TCSA) Gold Award for three consecutive years, the 60th anniversary of its establishment.

2017     Ranked among the top 5% of corporate governance evaluations for three consecutive years. Won the Taiwan Enterprise Perpetual Bonus Award for four consecutive years.

2018     Won four awards of the Taiwan Enterprise Sustainability Award. TECO Vietnam Motor Plant breaks ground, Vietnam will become an important base of TECO Group in Southeast Asia.

2019    Smart food delivery service robot won the Taiwan Excellence Silver Award. Dongjie Information listed on the OTC.

2020    "T Power" won the Taiwan Excellence Gold Award. Selected as a constituent stock of DJSI Dow Jones Sustainability Index-Emerging Markets.

Organization Structure

 Motor
 Top 3 global motor producer 
 Offering industrial motors ranging from 0.25 kW to 75,000 kW  
 Production and sales of high-efficiency motors, low- and high-voltage 3-phase motors, high-thrust motors, explosion-proof motors, steel-cased motors, single-phase motors, aluminum-cased motors, brake motors, eddy-current motors, inverter-duty motors, high-temperature exhaust gas fan motors, gear-reducing motors, crane motors, wound rotor motors, submersible motors, DC motors, ventilation blowers, synchronous motors, variable-pole motors, other motors/generators, compressors and wind-powered generators.
 System Automation 
 Entails the R&D, production and sales of industrial automation products and electronic control systems such as industrial inverter, servo system, electromagnetic switches & molded-case circuit breakers, etc.
 Production and sales of AC/DC motor controls, programmable logic controllers, servo controllers, electromagnetic switches, molded-case circuit breakers, electronic relays and other inverter products; as well as design and installation of power distribution networks.
 M&E Construction
 R&D, design, production, and sales of equipment and systems meant for the supply of electrical power
 Undertaking of projects related to power distribution and generation, alternative energy, and rail stations and depots
 Air-conditioning equipment for specific environments such as clean rooms
 Design, construction, and management of electrical engineering systems for high-rise buildings
 Integration of air-conditioning and electrical engineering systems for hospitals and hotels
 Water pump stations and other related projects
 Home Appliance
 Production, assembly, sales, and repair of household/commercial air conditioners, refrigerators, washing machines, dehumidifiers, dryers, televisions, LCD monitors, air purifiers, small appliances, DVD recorders, stereo systems, health appliances; dealership of other domestic and foreign home appliances brands.
 New Development – Wind Power
 Launched the first Taiwan-made 2 MW permanent-magnet synchronous wind turbine bearing own brand in March 2010
 Production and sales of FC-2000 2.0 MW PMSG (Permanent Magnetic Synchronous Generator) wind turbine, power converter, control system and KW level wind-power turbine

See also
 List of companies of Taiwan#T

External links
 Official web site

Companies listed on the Taiwan Stock Exchange
Companies based in Taipei
Electronics companies established in 1956
Computer hardware companies
Electronics companies of Taiwan
Portable audio player manufacturers
Taiwanese brands
Netbook manufacturers
Display technology companies
Wind power
Wind turbine manufacturers
1956 establishments in Taiwan